Indianola is a census-designated place in Humboldt County, California. The place appears on the USGS Arcata South map. Addresses in this neighborhood are part of unincorporated Eureka, California, located entirely within the 95503 ZIP code. The population was 823 at the 2010 census.

An Indian settlement was located under the bluff which was a supply center which sold bay fish, clams, and crabs.

A post office operated at Indianola from 1900 to 1915.

Demographics
The 2010 United States Census reported that Indianola had a population of 823. The racial makeup of Indianola was 713 (86.6%) White, 2 (0.2%) African American, 42 (5.1%) Native American, 11 (1.3%) Asian, 1 (0.1%) Pacific Islander, 12 (1.5%) from other races, and 42 (5.1%) from two or more races. Hispanic or Latino of any race were 44 persons (5.3%).

The Census reported that 823 people (100% of the population) lived in households, 0 (0%) lived in non-institutionalized group quarters, and 0 (0%) were institutionalized.

There were 356 households, out of which 91 (25.6%) had children under the age of 18 living in them, 160 (44.9%) were opposite-sex married couples living together, 46 (12.9%) had a female householder with no husband present, 18 (5.1%) had a male householder with no wife present.  There were 39 (11.0%) unmarried opposite-sex partnerships, and 3 (0.8%) same-sex married couples or partnerships. 96 households (27.0%) were made up of individuals, and 24 (6.7%) had someone living alone who was 65 years of age or older. The average household size was 2.31.  There were 224 families (62.9% of all households); the average family size was 2.73.

The population was spread out, with 157 people (19.1%) under the age of 18, 63 people (7.7%) aged 18 to 24, 200 people (24.3%) aged 25 to 44, 284 people (34.5%) aged 45 to 64, and 119 people (14.5%) who were 65 years of age or older.  The median age was 43.9 years. For every 100 females, there were 96.4 males.  For every 100 females age 18 and over, there were 96.5 males.

The homeowner vacancy rate was 0.7%; the rental vacancy rate was 2.2%.  673 people (81.8% of the population) lived in owner-occupied housing units and 150 people (18.2%) lived in rental housing units.

Politics

See also

References

Census-designated places in Humboldt County, California
Eureka, California
Census-designated places in California